"Would You Catch a Falling Star" is a song written by Bobby Braddock, and recorded by American country music artist John Anderson.  It was released in April 1982 as the second single from the album I Just Came Home to Count the Memories.  The song reached number 6 on the Billboard Hot Country Singles & Tracks chart. 

The song was covered by Del McCoury and Sierra Hull on the 2022 John Anderson tribute album Something Borrowed, Something New.

Content
"Would You Catch a Falling Star" is a tongue in cheek look at the pitfalls of stardom and fame, told of a one-time superstar whose drawing power and appeal to fans is fading.

The song opens telling about the performer, a one-time superstar, finishing a country music show, that had a small crowd. He then departs backstage, half drunk and meets a lady ("with all his country charm"), he says to her "Would you catch a falling star before he crashes to the ground." The song goes on to say that "nobody loves you when you're down". Stating that if she will pick him up and take him home, he will bring his old guitar, and sing a golden oldie song.

The next part of the song tells of his once wealth and fame, "He had a silver-plated bus, and a million country fans". The narrator states, now there's just a few of us and he drives a little van. He tells how the fans were beating down his door, lovely women left and right. Now he's down on his luck wondering where he will spend his night.

Charts

Weekly charts

Year-end charts

References

1982 singles
John Anderson (musician) songs
Songs written by Bobby Braddock
Warner Records singles
1981 songs